Tokio Express was a container ship, built and registered in Hamburg in 1973 for Hapag-Lloyd. In 1984 she was renamed Scandutch Edo before being acquired by Pol Gulf International in 1993 and restored to her original name. In 1997, she was acquired by Westwind International and in 1999, by Falani, before being broken up for scrap in 2000.

Tokio Express is best known for being hit by a rogue wave on 13 February 1997 that caused her to lose cargo, including one cargo container loaded with 4.8 million pieces of Lego. Ever since, Lego pieces including octopuses, dragons, flippers and flowers have been washing up on Cornwall beaches and are commonly found after storms.

The ship
Tokio Express was one of four Trio class container ships built for Hapag-Lloyd by Blohm + Voss in the early 1970s. These were all 3,000-TEU class ships. The first of these was Hamburg Express, which was followed by Bremen Express, Tokio Express and finally Hongkong Express.

The ships were originally powered by twin-screw. During the 1980s they all underwent a refit that included conversion to single screw propulsion, while retaining one of the turbines.

After changing hands several times as Hapag-Lloyd upgraded their fleet, Tokio Express was eventually scrapped in 2000. The name, with the English spelling, has since been re-used for a similar sized but much more modern container ship, launched in 2000.

Accident
She tilted 60 degrees one way, then 40 degrees back, losing 62 containers overboard. She put in at Southampton for attention after the accident.

One of the lost containers held just under 5 million Lego pieces. Coincidentally, a large portion of these were destined for toy kits depicting sea adventures, in lines including Lego Pirates and Lego Aquazone. Among the pieces were 418,000 swimming flippers, 97,500 scuba tanks, 26,600 life preservers, 13,000 spear guns, and 4,200 octopuses. Sea grass, cutlasses and dragons were also well-represented.

Since the accident, residents in Cornwall have found octopuses, dragons, diver flippers and pieces of sea grass washed ashore. Pieces may have travelled much further; a Dutch shipping clerk started an inventory which now has active participants in Florida, Georgia and the Carolinas looking for the arrival of more pieces.

See also

Hansa Carrier
Friendly Floatees
Curtis Ebbesmeyer

References

External links
 Lego Lost at Sea

Container ships
1972 ships
Ships built in Hamburg
Merchant ships of Germany
Maritime incidents in 1997
Lego